Andrew St George Tucker (1937–2003) was a Scottish-born, former sports shooter who represented England.

Sports shooting career
Tucker represented England and won a gold medal in the fullbore rifle pairs with Simon Belither and a silver medal in the individual fullbore rifle, at the 1990 Commonwealth Games in Auckland, New Zealand.

He won the Queen's Prize at the National Shooting Centre, Bisley, Surrey on two occasions.

References

1937 births
2003 deaths
British male sport shooters
Shooters at the 1990 Commonwealth Games
Commonwealth Games medallists in shooting
Commonwealth Games gold medallists for England
Commonwealth Games silver medallists for England
Medallists at the 1990 Commonwealth Games